This is a list of women writers who were born in Wales or whose writings are closely associated with that country.

A
Jane Aaron (born 1951), literature scholar, researcher and non-fiction writer
Jane Arden (1927–1982), film director, actress, screenwriter, playwright and poet
Tiffany Atkinson (born 1972), poet, educator
Trezza Azzopardi (born 1961), novelist and short story writer: The Hiding Place

B
Mary Balogh (born 1944), Welsh-Canadian historical novelist
Rachel Barrett (1874–1953), suffragette and newspaper editor
Anne Beale (1816–1900), popular novelist, poet and children's writer
Anna Maria Bennett (c. 1750–1808), novelist
Ruth Bidgood (1922–2022), poet
Emily Rose Bleby (1849-1917), non-fiction writer and temperance activist
Natasha Bowen, Nigerian Welsh novelist
Jane Brereton (1685–1740), poet and contributor to The Gentleman's Magazine 
Rhoda Broughton (1840–1920), novelist and short story writer
Fanny Mary Katherine Bulkeley-Owen (1845–1927), historian and author

C
Brenda Chamberlain (1912–1971), artist and poet
Grace Coddington (born 1941), fashion writer, director of Vogue, memoirist
Gillian Clarke (born 1937), poet, playwright, translator and broadcaster
Hafina Clwyd (1936–2011), educator and journalist
Jasmine Cresswell (born 1941),novelist

D
Fflur Dafydd (born 1978), novelist, playwright, poet and singer, in Welsh and English
Catherine Glyn Davies (1926–2007), historian and translator
Deborah Kay Davies, contemporary poet, novelist and educator
Margaret Davies (fl. 1700s), poet and scribe
Mary Davies (1846–1882), poet
Amy Dillwyn (1845–1935), novelist and industrialist

E
Dorothy Edwards (1903–1934), fiction writer
Fanny Winifred Edwards (1876–1959), children's author, dramatist and schoolteacher
Rhian Edwards (active from 2000s), poet
Sally El Hosaini (born 1976), British-Egyption film director and screenwriter
Elen Egryn (1807–1897), Welsh-language poet
Menna Elfyn (born 1952), Welsh-language poet, playwright, columnist and editor
Christine Evans (born 1943), poet
Margiad Evans (1909–1958), poet and novelist

F
Catherine Fisher (born 1957), novelist, poet and broadcaster

G
Menna Gallie (1919–1990), novelist and translator
Isabella Gifford (1825–1891), marine botanist 
Annabel Giles (born 1950), broadcaster, novelist and actress
Ann Griffiths (1776–1805), Welsh-language poet and hymn writer
Bethan Gwanas, pen name of Bethan Evans (born 1962), Welsh-language novelist and children's writer

H
Ann Hatton (1764–1838), (Ann of Swansea) English-language novelist
Myfanwy Haycock (1913–1963), poet, artist and broadcaster
Felicia Hemans (1793–1835), English-born Welsh poet writing in English
Ann Harriet Hughes (1852–1910), Welsh-language novelist and poet
Ellen Hughes (1867–1927), Welsh-language writer, poet and suffragist
Emily Huws (born 1942), Welsh-language children's writer

I
Elisabeth Inglis-Jones (1900–1994), novelist
Norah Isaac (1915–2003), Welsh-language short story writer, playwright and travel writer

J
Maria James (1793–1868), Welsh-born American poet
Alice Gray Jones (1852–1943), poet, editor
Margaret Jones (1842–1902), travel writer
Mary Vaughan Jones (1918–1983), children's writer and teacher
Sally Roberts Jones (born 1935), poet and biographer

L
Eiluned Lewis (1900–1979), novelist, poet and journalist
Gwyneth Lewis (born 1959), Welsh-language poet, national poet of Wales, also in English
Martha Llwyd (1766–1845), poet and hymnist

M
Ruth Manning-Sanders (1886–1988), poet and children's writer
Ursula Masson (1945–2008), educator, literature researcher and non-fiction writer
Gwerful Mechain (15th century), Welsh-language poet
Nia Medi, since 2005, Welsh-language novelist and actress
Dorothy Miles (1931–1993), poet, in English and sign language
Moelona, pen name of Elizabeth Mary Jones (1877–1953), Welsh-language novelist, children's writer and translator
Jan Morris (born James Morris, 1926–2020), Welsh historian and travel writer
Ann Moray (1909–1981), novelist, short story writer and singer
Elaine Morgan (1920–2013), non-fiction writer on anthropology, playwright and columnist
Elena Puw Morgan (1900–1973), Welsh-language novelist and children's writer
Eluned Morgan (1870–1938), Welsh-language author from Patagonia, travel writer and non-fiction writer
Gwenllian Elizabeth Fanny Morgan (1852–1939), non-fiction writer and mayor
Penelope Mortimer (1918–1999), journalist, biographer and novelist
Wendy Mulford (born 1941), poet and feminist

N
Mary Edith Nepean (1876–1960), romantic novelist

O
Pixie O'Harris (1903–1991), Welsh-born Australian artist, poet, autobiographer and illustrator

P
Sarah Winifred Parry (1870–1953) fiction writer
Amy Parry-Williams (1910–1988), singer and writer
Jessie Penn-Lewis (1861–1927), evangelist, religious writer and magazine publisher
Anne Penny (1729–1784), poet
Ellis Peters (1913–1995), Welsh-English mystery fiction writer and translator: Brother Cadfael
Pascale Petit (born 1953), poet
Katherine Philips (1632–1664), poet and translator
Angharad Price (living), novelist and academic
Myfanwy Pryce (1890–1976), fiction writer

R
Allen Raine, pen name of Anne Adalisa Beynon Puddicombe (1836–1908), novelist in English and Welsh
Helen Raynor (born 1972), television screenwriter, script editor and playwright
Sarah Jane Rees (1839–1916), teacher, poet and temperance campaigner
Deryn Rees-Jones (fl. since 1994), poet and essayist
Eigra Lewis Roberts (born 1939), poet, children's writer and novelist in Welsh
Kate Roberts (1891–1985), Welsh-language fiction writer
Jane Helen Rowlands (1891–1955), linguist, non-fiction writer and missionary
Bernice Rubens (1923–2004), novelist: The Elected Member

S
Carole Seymour-Jones (born 1963), biographer, columnist and literary non-fiction writer
Dorothy Simpson (born 1933), mystery novelist and crime-fiction writer
Mari Strachan (born 1945), novelist and librarian
Jennifer Sullivan (born 1945), children's writer and critic
Rosie Swale-Pope (born 1946), non-fiction writer and marathon runner

T
Louie Myfanwy Thomas (1908–1968), novelist
Hester Thrale (1741–1821), diarist
Barbara Margaret Trimble (1921–1995), novelist

V
Hilda Vaughan (1892–1985), fiction writer, playwright: The Invader

W
Jo Walton (born 1964), Welsh-Canadian romance and science fiction novelist: Tooth and Claw
Anna Laetitia Waring (1823–1910), poet and hymnist
Sarah Waters (born 1966), novelist: Fingersmith
Susie Wild (born 1979), novelist, journalist and editor
Anna Williams (1706–1783), poet
Jane Williams (1806–1885), biographer and non-fiction writer

Y
Paula Yates (1959–2000), non-fiction writer and television presenter

See also
List of women writers

References

-
Welsh
Writers
Writers, women
Welsh, women